Bryan Dennis Angulo Tenorio (born 30 November 1995) is an Ecuadorian professional footballer who plays as a forward for Emelec.

Club career

Early career
Angulo was born in Guayaquil, and joined Rocafuerte's youth setup in 2009. In July 2013, after already making his first team debut in Segunda Categoría del Guayas, he was loaned to Serie A side Emelec, for two years.

Emelec
On 11 October 2014, after being regularly used with the reserve side, Angulo made his first team debut, coming on as a late substitute for goalscorer Miller Bolaños in a 3–1 away win against Manta. On 5 February 2015, after featuring in seven league matches the previous campaign, he was bought outright by Emelec and agreed to a contract until 2019.

Angulo only became a starter for the club from the 2016 season onwards, and scored his first goal on 8 May of that year by netting the equalizer in a 3–3 home draw against River Ecuador. On 9 October, he scored a brace in a 3–1 home win against Fuerza Amarilla.

Angulo was the second topscorer of the 2018 campaign by netting 29 goals, eight behind Jhon Cifuente.

Cruz Azul
On 6 August 2019, Liga MX side Cruz Azul announced an agreement with Emelec for the transfer of Angulo. Three days later, he was officially announced as the new addition of the club.

Loan to Tijuana
On 26 December 2019, after just nine matches for Cruz Azul, Angulo moved to fellow league team Tijuana on loan. Despite featuring rarely, his loan was cut short in January 2021.

Return from loan
After returning to the Cementeros, Angulo scored his first goal for the club on 28 February 2021, netting the winner in a 1–0 away success over León. On 31 March 2022, he left the club after terminating his contract.

Santos
On 2 April 2022, Angulo switched teams and countries again after signing a contract with Brazilian club Santos until June 2023. He made his debut for the club seven days later, replacing Ricardo Goulart in a 0–0 away draw against Fluminense.

Emelec return
On 18 December 2022, Emelec announced the signing of Angulo on a two-year contract.

International career
On 7 November 2018, Angulo was called up by Ecuador manager Hernán Darío Gómez for friendlies against Peru and Panama. He made his full international debut thirteen days later, starting in a 2–1 win against the latter in Panama City.

Personal life
Angulo was accused of a murder that occurred in his hometown of Guayaquil during the early hours of 25 December 2020. The following day, his name was withdrawn from the investigation.

Career statistics

Club

International

Honours
Cruz Azul
 Liga MX: Guardianes 2021
 Campeón de Campeones: 2021
 Leagues Cup: 2019

References

External links

Brayan Angulo profile  at Federación Ecuatoriana de Fútbol 

1995 births
Living people
Sportspeople from Guayaquil
Ecuadorian footballers
Association football forwards
Ecuadorian Serie A players
Liga MX players
Campeonato Brasileiro Série A players
C.S. Emelec footballers
Cruz Azul footballers
Club Tijuana footballers
Santos FC players
Ecuador international footballers
Ecuadorian expatriate footballers
Ecuadorian expatriate sportspeople in Mexico
Ecuadorian expatriate sportspeople in Brazil
Expatriate footballers in Mexico
Expatriate footballers in Brazil